, Also known as Today's Close-Up, is a current affairs television programme produced by the Japanese public broadcaster NHK. The programme broadcasts on Mondays through Wednesdays at 19:30 - 19:57 (UTC+9) on NHK G channel, which also airs on NHK World Premium and NHK World-Japan on a weekly basis.

The Japan Times reported in January 2016 that the NHK is considering making changes to the programme, which may include the removal of Hiroko Kuniya, who has hosted the show since its inception.

The show was returned as Close-up Gendai Plus on April 4, 2016, with the introduction of bi-anchor format.

On April 2, 2019, the Monday edition of the programme was cancelled due to cost-cutting measures by the NHK.

On April 4, 2022, the show was renamed back to Close-up Gendai after 6 years, with a new updated graphics. The Monday edition of the programme was revived after 3 years, while the Thursday edition was cancelled.

References

External links
 Close-up Gendai Plus
Today's Close-up on NHK World-Japan

Japanese television news shows
1990s Japanese television series
1993 Japanese television series debuts
NHK original programming